The Pratt & Whitney Canada PW100 aircraft engine family is a series of  turboprops manufactured by Pratt & Whitney Canada. Pratt & Whitney Canada dominates the turboprops market with 89% of the turboprop regional airliner installed base in 2016, leading GE Aviation and Allison Engine Company.

Development
The engine was first introduced as a technology demonstrator in 1977. The PW100 was first tested in March 1981, made its initial flight in February 1982 on a Vickers Viscount testbed aircraft, and then entered service in December 1984 on a Dash 8 regional aircraft for NorOntair.

The PW150 engine was introduced on 24 April 1995, when Bombardier selected the engine for the launch of its de Havilland Dash 8-400 regional turboprop. The PW150 was a higher-power version of the PW100 series, with the low-pressure compressor changed from a single-stage centrifugal compressor to a three-stage axial compressor, and the turbine modified to have improved cooling.

At the 2021 Dubai Air Show, Pratt & Whitney Canada introduced the PW127XT (extended-time-on-wing) series. The PW127XT, which is intended to replace the PW127M variant, reduces the number of engine overhauls within 10 years to two from three. The engine maintenance interval (time-on-wing) is increased from 14,000 hours to 20,000 hours and would use three percent less fuel than the PW127M. The engine series will premiere as the standard powerplant on all new ATR 42 and ATR 72 aircraft, with a launch order from Air Corsica using the PW127XT-M engine model. The PW127XT-N variant, which is designed for the ATR 72-600, has the same mechanical power rating as the PW127XT-M but has a higher thermodynamic power rating.

Design
Originally called the PT7, the PW100 uses a relatively unusual three-shaft engine configuration.  In the PW100, a centrifugal low-pressure (LP) impeller (except for the PW150, which uses a 3-stage axial LP compressor), driven by a single-stage LP turbine, supercharges a contra-rotating centrifugal high-pressure (HP) impeller, driven by a single-stage HP turbine.  Power is delivered to the offset propeller reduction gearbox through a third shaft, connected to a two-stage free (power) turbine. The gearbox has two stages, yielding a reduction ratio between 15.4 and 17.16. The first stage uses double helical gears, followed by a second stage with straight spur gears.

Variants

The last two digits of each variant model number represent the nominal power at takeoff, in hundreds of horsepower.

Other variants 
 PW119
 , no longer in service.
 PW124
 , no longer in service.
 PW124A
 No longer in service.
 PW125
 No longer in service.
 PW125A
 No longer in service.
 PW127TS
  turboshaft version that powered the first 2 prototypes of the Mil Mi-38 helicopter and was to be used on the Mi-38-1 variant.
 PW127XT-S
 Selected to power the Deutsche Aircraft D328eco in June 2022.
 PW130
 Unsuccessfully offered for the Saab 2000 and IPTN N-250 aircraft. Proposed for the unbuilt Fokker 50-400 aircraft.
 PW150 Twin Pack
 Proposed powerplant for the Airbus A400M. Two PW150-based engines would be used to drive a single propeller. The powerplant was eliminated from contention by Airbus in early June 1999, since it was short of providing the  required to drive the eight-bladed propeller at the time, and its specific fuel consumption (SFC) was excessive.
 PW150B
 Proposed powerplant for the Shaanxi Y-8F-600. Abandoned in December 2008 when the United States government barred a U.S.-based subcontractor from exporting the engine control software for the PW150B.
 PW150C
 Proposed powerplant for the Xian MA700. Includes a third-stage power turbine, larger-diameter propellers, modified reduction gearbox, and optimized low-pressure compressor. Has higher thrust, higher speed, and extended range compared to the PW150A. Blocked from an export license by the Canadian government in 2020, because of the Chinese government's retaliatory detention of Canadian citizens (the "two Michaels") starting in 2018.
 ST18M
 Marine application for the PW100.
 ST40M
 Marine application for the PW150A.

Applications

Aircraft

Other applications
 Bombardier JetTrain
 Skjold-class corvette

Specifications

See also

References

Bibliography

External links

 

1980s turboprop engines
Pratt & Whitney Canada aircraft engines